A mutant protein is the protein product encoded by a gene with mutation. Mutated protein can have single amino acid change (minor, but still in many cases significant change leading to disease) or wide-range amino acid changes by e.g. truncation of C-terminus after introducing premature stop codon.

See also 
 Site-directed mutagenesis
 Phi value analysis
 missense mutation
 nonsense mutation
 point mutation
 frameshift mutation
 silent mutation
 single-nucleotide polymorphism

References 

Proteins
Mutation